Karanjia is a town in the eastern Indian state of Odisha, about 221 kilometres (134 mi) north of the state capital Bhubaneswar. It is the sub-divisional headquarter of Panchpir sub-division and a Notified Area Council in Mayurbhanj district. It is bounded on its South-East by Deo river which forms the natural district border for Mayurbhanj.

Demographics
As of the 2011 Indian census Karanjia had a population of 22,865. Males constitute 49% of the population, females 51%.  Karanjia has an average literacy rate of 83.35%, higher than the state average of 72.87%. Male literacy is 89.10%, and female literacy is 77.76%. 10.45% are under 6.

Religion
It hosts a shrine to Maa Ambika. The other major temples are Jagannath temple, Shyamarai Temple, Purneshwar Shiva temple, Maa Mangala temple, Shyam Baba Temple, Rani Sati temple, Barkhanda temple of Gadsahi, Bamanashala, Sri Ganesh statue, Thakur Ankulchandra temple, Satyasai temple, Rameswar Baba Shiva Temple and Brameswara Mandir Karadia.

The mosque is one of the oldest in Mayurbhanj.

The famous shrine of 8th century Kichakeshwari temple, Khiching along with ancient ruins of forts and temples are situated 27 km from town.

Karanjia is known for its Dola Yatra and Mela that is celebrated in falgun month of Odia Panjika (calendar). It is a century-old festival of this locality.

Attractions
Bhimkund is a natural water tank situated 40 km from Karanjia. Simlipal National Park, is a nearby tiger reserve 40–50 km from town. Maa Tarini Temple, Rani Sati Mandir, Brameswara Mandir, Lord Jagannath Temple, Ramtirtha waterfalls, Sanaghagara Waterfall are located near the town.

Maa Kichakeshwari Temple is located nearby in Khiching. Kichakgarh and Viratgarh are other attractions there. Khiching is flanked by Kantakhairi and Khairibhandan rivers.

Education

Schools 

More than 20 schools operate in Karanjia, including:
 Ananda Marga Gurukul
 Vikash Convent School, Karanjia
 Saraswati Sishu Vidya Teertha)

 D. M. Public School
 DAV Public School
 Karanjia Govt. High School
 Karanjia Govt. Girls' High School
 Khajuri Sagar School
 Similipal English Medium School
 Sovaniya Sikhyashram
 Vivekananda Public School 
 Karadia Ug. Me. School
 St Xavier School
Girima U.G.U.P. School, Dolpadia
 Odisha State Brigade Public School (O.S.B.P.S.)
ANKURA, KARANJIA
College':
 Karanjia (Auto) College, Karanjia
 Panchpir Women's College, Karanjia
 Similipal +2 Residential College
 Karanjia Industrial Training Institute
 Maa Mangala College of Pharmaceutical Sciences

Politics
Karanjia is part of Keonjhar (Lok Sabha constituency).

The current MLA is Basanti Hembram. She won the seat in State elections of 2019 as a candidate of Biju Janata Dal by defeating the candidate of Bharatiya Janata Party.

Karanjia is part of Keonjhar Loksabha constituency. The MP is Chandrani Murmu who won it by defeating the Bharatiya Janata Party candidate Ananta Nayak.

References

Cities and towns in Mayurbhanj district